Thermonotus ruber is a species of beetle in the family Cerambycidae. It was described by Maurice Pic in 1923, originally as the type species of the genus Gibbanamera. It is known from China and Vietnam. It feeds on Lindera communis.

References

Lamiini
Beetles described in 1923